Tristan-Patrice Challulau (born 13 November 1959 in Aix-en-Provence) is a French composer.

In 1991, he won the first composition prize at the Queen Elisabeth Competition.

In 1996 he was a resident of the Laurent Vibert Foundation at the Château de Lourmarin.

In 1996/1997 he was a member of the Casa Velázquez in Madrid. Among other things, he wrote his REQUIEM in memoriam Baudoin 1er (recorded on CD)

In 1977/2018 he was an independent composer (member of the Polymus group, the MIM -Laboratoire Musique Informatique de Marseille- and the Decadanse Ensemble). He was also a guest at the Round Top Festival Institute (Texas) where he wrote Round Top eagles - a piece for piano M.G. alone, set as a piano/orchestra concerto about ten years later.

References

External links
 Personal website
 Tristan Patrice Challulau Concert solidarité Tunisie (YouTube)

1959 births
Living people
musicians from Aix-en-Provence
20th-century French musicians
21st-century French musicians
French classical composers
French male classical composers
20th-century French male musicians
21st-century French male musicians
Prize-winners of the Queen Elisabeth Competition